Regencies (kabupaten) and cities (kota) are the second-level administrative subdivision in Indonesia, immediately below the provinces, and above the districts. Regencies are roughly equivalent to American counties, although most cities in the United States are below the counties. Following the implementation of decentralization beginning on 1 January 2001, regencies and city municipalities became the key administrative units responsible for providing most governmental services. Each of regencies and cities has their own local government and legislative body.

The difference between a regency and a city lies in demography, size, and economy. Generally, a regency comprises a rural area larger than a city, but also often includes various towns. A city usually has non-agricultural economic activities. A regency is headed by a regent (bupati), while a city is headed by a mayor (wali kota). All regents, mayors, and members of legislatures are directly elected via elections to serve for a five-year term which can be renewed once. Each regency or city is divided further into districts more commonly known as kecamatan (except in Western New Guinea, where distrik is used).

An administrative city (kota administrasi) or an administrative regency (kabupaten administrasi) is a subdivision of province without its own local legislatures (Dewan Perwakilan Rakyat Daerah). The leader of administrative city or administrative regency is directly appointed by the governor. This type of city and regency in Indonesia is only found in Jakarta which consisted of five administrative cities and one administrative regency.

, there were 514-second-level administrative divisions (416 regencies and 98 cities) in Indonesia. The list below groups regencies and cities in Indonesia by provinces. Each regency has an administrative centre, the regency seat.

List of regencies and cities by province

Sumatra

Aceh

North Sumatra

West Sumatra

Jambi

Riau

Bengkulu

South Sumatra

Lampung

Bangka Belitung Islands

Riau Islands

Java

Special Capital Region of Jakarta

Banten

West Java

Central Java

East Java

Special Region of Yogyakarta

Lesser Sunda Islands

Bali

West Nusa Tenggara

East Nusa Tenggara

Kalimantan

West Kalimantan

South Kalimantan

Central Kalimantan

East Kalimantan

North Kalimantan

Sulawesi

Gorontalo

South Sulawesi

West Sulawesi

Southeast Sulawesi

Central Sulawesi

North Sulawesi

Maluku Islands

Maluku

North Maluku

Western New Guinea

West Papua

Papua

Highland Papua

Central Papua

South Papua

Southwest Papua

Superlatives 
Superlatives of cities can be found at Indonesian Wikipedia articles Daftar kota di Indonesia menurut jumlah penduduk and Daftar kota di Indonesia menurut luas wilayah. Although the least populated regency in Indonesian by various sources is held by Tana Tidung Regency of North Kalimantan, Tambrauw Regency is included here instead because it is effectively has fewer population of about 13 thousand people compared to 24 thousand people of Tana Tidung Regency.

Subdivision splits

Following the Regional Autonomy Act of 1999, many regencies have been split to create additional regencies and cities, the number of such divisions were thus increased to 514. However, these territorial splits can sometimes lead into corruption cases. As of 2020, any further proposals for territorial splits are still in moratorium.

The latest new regencies split from existing regencies were South Buton Regency, Central Buton Regency and West Muna Regency in July 2014, while the latest cities were South Tangerang and Gunungsitoli in October 2008. There are no cities which have been split into other subdivisions, although the administrative regency of Thousand Islands was split from North Jakarta administrative city in 2001. Despite the name of South Tangerang being similar to that of Tangerang city, South Tangerang was actually split from Tangerang Regency. 

In two special cases, all subdivisions of North Maluku and Riau Islands were made from parts of the defunct North Maluku Regency and Riau Islands Regency, respectively. All subdivisions of North Kalimantan are also made from lands of Bulungan Regency, but its area was split to several regencies before the province was established. Central Java and Special Region of Yogyakarta are the only provinces which have not had any subdivision splits. Listed below are the subdivision splits from 2007 to the most recent ones in 2014; for pre-2007 splits see also main article in Indonesian Wikipedia.

2014

Southeast Sulawesi
South Buton Regency from Buton Regency (23 July 2014)
Central Buton Regency from Buton Regency (23 July 2014)
West Muna Regency from Muna Regency (23 July 2014)

2013

South Sumatra
North Musi Rawas Regency from Musi Rawas Regency (10 June 2013)

Central Sulawesi
North Morowali Regency from Morowali Regency (12 April 2013)

Southeast Sulawesi
Konawe Islands Regency from Konawe Regency (12 April 2013)

2012

South Sumatra
Penukal Abab Lematang Ilir Regency from Muara Enim Regency (14 December 2012)

East Nusa Tenggara
Malaka Regency from Belu Regency (14 December 2012)

East Kalimantan
Mahakam Ulu Regency from West Kutai Regency (14 December 2012)

Central Sulawesi
Banggai Laut Regency from Banggai Islands Regency (14 December 2012)

West Sulawesi
Central Mamuju Regency from Mamuju Regency (14 December 2012)

Southeast Sulawesi
East Kolaka Regency from Kolaka Regency (14 December 2012)

North Maluku
Taliabu Island Regency from Sula Islands Regency (14 December 2012)

Lampung
Pesisir Barat Regency from West Lampung Regency (25 October 2012)

West Java
Pangandaran Regency from Ciamis Regency (25 October 2012)

West Papua
South Manokwari Regency and Arfak Mountains Regency from Manokwari Regency (25 October 2012)

2008

North Sumatra
Gunungsitoli city from Nias Regency (29 October 2008)
North Nias Regency from Nias Regency (29 October 2008)
West Nias Regency from Nias Regency (29 October 2008)
North Labuhan Batu Regency from Labuhan Batu Regency (24 June 2008)
South Labuhan Batu Regency from Labuhan Batu Regency (24 June 2008)

Jambi
Sungai Penuh from Kerinci Regency (24 June 2008)

Riau
Meranti Islands Regency from Bengkalis Regency (19 December 2008)

Bengkulu
Central Bengkulu Regency from North Bengkulu Regency (24 June 2008)

Lampung
Mesuji Regency from Tulang Bawang Regency (29 October 2008)
West Tulang Bawang Regency from Tulang Bawang Regency (29 October 2008)
Pringsewu Regency from Tanggamus Regency (29 October 2008)

Riau Islands
Anambas Islands Regency from Natuna Regency (24 June 2008)

Banten
South Tangerang city from Tangerang Regency (29 October 2008)

West Nusa Tenggara
North Lombok Regency from West Lombok Regency (24 June 2008)

East Nusa Tenggara
Sabu Raijua Regency from Kupang Regency (29 October 2008)

North Sulawesi
East Bolaang Mongondow Regency from Bolaang Mongondow Regency (24 June 2008)
South Bolaang Mongondow Regency from Bolaang Mongondow Regency (24 June 2008)

Central Sulawesi
Sigi Regency from Donggala Regency (24 June 2008)

South Sulawesi
North Toraja Regency from Tana Toraja Regency (24 June 2008)

Maluku
South Buru Regency from Buru Regency (24 June 2008)
Southwest Maluku Regency from Western Southeast Maluku Regency (Tanimbar Islands Regency) (24 June 2008)

North Maluku
Morotai Island Regency from North Halmahera Regency (29 October 2008)

West Papua
Tambrauw Regency from Sorong Regency, South Sorong Regency and Manokwari Regency (29 October 2008)
Maybrat Regency from Sorong Regency (19 December 2008)

Papua
Lanny Jaya Regency, Central Mamberamo Regency, Nduga Regency and Yalimo Regency from Jayawijaya Regency (4 January 2008)
Puncak Regency from Puncak Jaya Regency (4 January 2008)
Dogiyai Regency from Nabire Regency (4 January 2008)
Deiyai Regency and Intan Jaya Regency from Paniai Regency (29 October 2008)

2007

Aceh
Subulussalam from Aceh Singkil Regency (2 January 2007)
Pidie Jaya Regency from Pidie Regency (2 January 2007)

North Sumatra
Batubara Regency from Asahan Regency (2 January 2007)
Padang Lawas Regency and North Padang Lawas Regency from South Tapanuli Regency (17 July 2007)

South Sumatra
Empat Lawang Regency from Lahat Regency (2 January 2007)

Lampung
Pesawaran Regency from South Lampung Regency (17 July 2007)

Banten
Serang from Serang Regency (17 July 2007)

West Java
West Bandung Regency from Bandung Regency (2 January 2007)

East Nusa Tenggara
Nagekeo Regency from Ngada Regency (2 January 2007)
Central Sumba Regency and Southwest Sumba Regency from West Sumba Regency (2 January 2007)
East Manggarai Regency from Manggarai Regency (17 July 2007)

West Kalimantan
Kubu Raya Regency from Pontianak Regency (Mempawah Regency) (17 July 2007)

North Kalimantan
Tana Tidung Regency from Bulungan Regency (17 July 2007)

North Sulawesi
Kotamobagu and North Bolaang Mongondow Regency from Bolaang Mongondow Regency (2 January 2007)
Siau Tagulandang Biaro Islands Regency from Sangihe Islands Regency (2 January 2007)
Southeast Minahasa Regency from South Minahasa Regency (2 January 2007)

Gorontalo
North Gorontalo Regency from Gorontalo Regency (2 January 2007)

Southeast Sulawesi
North Konawe Regency from Konawe Regency (2 January 2007)
North Buton Regency from Muna Regency (2 January 2007)

Maluku
Tual from Southeast Maluku Regency (17 July 2007)

Papua
Mamberamo Raya Regency from Sarmi Regency (15 March 2007)

Former regencies

These regencies are defunct by splitting its lands together, or renamed. This list does not include colonial-era regencies, or former regencies of the former province of East Timor.

See also
List of Indonesian cities by population
List of Indonesian regencies by population

References

Subdivisions of Indonesia
Regencies, Indonesia
Regencies and cities
Indonesia
Indonesia